Whortleberry may refer to the berries of several plants of genus Vaccinium:

 Vaccinium myrtillus,  European bilberry or blue whortleberry
 Vaccinium vitis-idaea, lingonberry or red whortleberry
 Vaccinium uliginosum, bog whortleberry/bilberry

See also
 Bilberry